Francis or Frances Parsons may refer to:
Francis Parsons (painter) (died 1804), British painter
Francis Newton Parsons (1875–1900), British soldier and recipient of the Victoria Cross
Frances Griscom Parsons (1850–1925), American reformer and educator
Frances Theodora Parsons (1861–1952), American botanist

See also
Frank Parsons (disambiguation)